Johan is the debut album by the Dutch band Johan. It was released on November 4, 1996 by the record label Excelsior Recordings. The album was produced by Frans Hagenaars.

The album was released in the US in June 1997 by the record label SpinArt.

Track listing

 "Everybody Knows" 
 "Not Funny Anymore (It's)" 
 "Back In School" 
 "Payment" 
 "5 O' Clock (It's)" 
 "Easy (It's)" 
 "Suffer Baby" 
 "Life On Mars" 
 "December" 
 "Porneaux" 
 "Swing"
 "He's Not There" 
 "Brown Mice"

Johan (band) albums
1996 debut albums